Pterocalla fenestrata is a species of ulidiid or picture-winged fly in the genus Pterocalla of the family Tephritidae.

References

Ulidiidae
Insects described in 1899